Edward J. Matesic (1907–1988) was an American football player for the Philadelphia Eagles and the Pittsburgh Pirates.  Led the University of Pittsburgh in interceptions in 1931. In 1931 only the statistics of yards and touchdowns were recorded and not the number of interceptions. In 1931 Ed had 91 yards and one touchdown on interceptions. Then played HB/TB in the pros. Was the Pittsburgh Pirates starting quarterback in 1936. Pirates later became the Pittsburgh Steelers. In his pro career, Matesic threw for 1,412 yards and 8 touchdowns, ran for 377 yards and 1 touchdown, and caught 4 passes for 51 yards and one touchdown.

1907 births
Pittsburgh Panthers football players
Pittsburgh Steelers players
Philadelphia Eagles players
1988 deaths
Players of American football from West Virginia
People from Marshall County, West Virginia
Wilmington Clippers players